Funairi-kawaguchi-cho is a Hiroden station on the Hiroden Eba Line located in Nishi-kawaguchi-cho, Naka-ku, Hiroshima. It is operated by the Hiroshima Electric Railway.

Routes
There are three routes that serve Funairi-kawaguchi-cho Station:
 Hiroshima Station - Eba Route
 Yokogawa Station - Eba Route
 Hakushima - Eba Route

Station layout
The station consists of two side platforms serving two tracks. Crosswalks connect the platforms with the sidewalk. There is a shelter located in the middle of each platform.

Adjacent stations

Bus connections
Hiroden Bus Route #6 at Funairi-kawaguchi-cho bus stop

Surrounding area
Hiroshima Municipal Funairi High School
Hiroshima City Funairi Elementary School

History
Opened on June 20, 1944.
Service was stopped on February 1, 1945.
Reopened on December 1, 1947.

See also

Hiroden Streetcar Lines and Routes

References

Funairi-kawaguchi-cho Station
Railway stations in Japan opened in 1944